Pfarrwerfen is a municipality in the St. Johann im Pongau district in the Austrian state of Salzburg.

Geography
Pfarrwerfen lies in the Pongau.

References

Gallery 

Cities and towns in St. Johann im Pongau District
Tennen Mountains
Berchtesgaden Alps